Jupiter 1 or variant may refer to:

 Jupiter One, a U.S. rock band
 Jupiter One (album), the eponymous 2008 album by the band Jupiter One
 Jupiter I, an early name for Io, a moon of Jupiter
 Roland Jupiter-1, the original Roland Jupiter synthesizer
 Brazil Straker Jupiter I, a variant of the Bristol Jupiter aircraft engine

See also
 Jupiter (disambiguation)

Disambiguation pages